The FIRST Championship is a four-day robotics championship held annually in April at which FIRST student robotics teams compete. For several years, the event was held at the Georgia Dome in Atlanta, Georgia, but moved to the Edward Jones Dome in St. Louis, Missouri in 2011, where it remained through 2017. In 2017, the Championship was split into two events, being additionally held at the George R. Brown Convention Center and Minute Maid Park in Houston, Texas. In 2018 and 2019, the Championship was held in Houston and Detroit, Michigan at the TCF Center and Ford Field. The event comprises four competitions; the FIRST Robotics Competition Championship, the FIRST Tech Challenge World Championship, the FIRST Lego League World Festival, and the FIRST Lego League Junior World Expo.

The FIRST Robotics Competition is a ten-week program in which high-school students build 125-pound (54 kg) robots designed to compete in a game that changes each year. Students are given sets of parts to use, but they can also use off-the-shelf or custom-made parts. The FIRST Tech Challenge is a mid-level competition program for middle school and high school aged students with a more accessible and affordable robotics kit. FIRST LEGO League is a competition program for elementary and middle school students using LEGO Mindstorms robotics kits. Teams for each program compete in tournaments at a state and regional level. The winning teams from each of these tournaments join the global competition at the FIRST Championship.

The FIRST Championship was formally held in conjunction with the FIRST Robotics Conference, which covers a wide variety of topics in science, technology, engineering, and robotics fields.

The 2011 championship was also host to the Collegiate Aerial Robotics Demonstration, a pilot collegiate FIRST program.

In 2015, to expand, it was announced that the FIRST Championship would be divided into multiple venues. The new Innovation Faire featuring displays and demonstrations from FIRST Sponsors, Partners and Suppliers took place at the Renaissance St. Louis Grand Hotel, The FIRST Tech Challenge  World Championship and the Junior FIRST Lego League  World Festival took place at Union Station (St. Louis), and the FIRST LEGO League World Festival as well as the FIRST Robotics Competition  Championship took place at the Edward Jones Dome and America's Center. The new arrangement was designed to give an "Olympic Village" feel and allow for more space to expand each individual program. In 2017, the Championship was split into 2 championships, one occurring in Houston and the other a week later in St. Louis. The second Championship was moved to Detroit for 2018 and 2019. In 2020, FIRST decided to move the closing ceremonies for all programs from Minute Maid Park and Ford Field to the convention centers in Houston and Detroit respectively. 

The 2020 FIRST season was suspended on March 12, 2020, resulting in the cancellation of the Championship events in Houston and Detroit, due to the COVID-19 pandemic. The FIRST LEGO League World Championship was held as a virtual competition on April 18 and 19, 2020 and hosted by FLL Share and Learn. 

The 2021 FIRST Championship in Houston and Detroit were cancelled due to the COVID-19 pandemic. The events were replaced by a virtual ceremony at the 2021 FIRST Global Innovation Awards on June 28–30, 2021. 

Despite originally announcing dates for both Detroit and Houston for 2022,  the 2022 FIRST Championship is now scheduled solely for Houston and is planned for April 20-23, 2022.

Host cities
1992: Manchester, NH
1993–1994: Nashua, NH
1995–2002: Orlando, FL, at Epcot Center, Walt Disney World
2003: Houston, at Reliant Park (now known as NRG Park)
2004–2010: Atlanta, at Georgia Dome
2011–2017: St. Louis, at Dome at America's Center, America's Center, Renaissance St. Louis Grand Hotel (2015-2017), Union Station (St. Louis) (2015-2017)
2017–2019: Houston, at George R. Brown Convention Center and Minute Maid Park
2018–2019: Detroit, at Cobo Center and Ford Field
2022–2023: Houston, at George R. Brown Convention Center

1992 was the first year of the FIRST Robotics Competition. Just over 20 teams competed at one event, which was held at Memorial High School in Manchester, New Hampshire. In 1993, the sole competition was held at Bishop Guertin High School in Nashua, New Hampshire. In 1994, the competition was held at Nashua High School. In 1995, FIRST had grown to the point to which they had outgrown the one competition, so they moved to a regional qualifier system, and thus the FIRST championship was born. From 1995 through 2002, the championship was held at Epcot Center in Orlando. Reliant Park in Houston was the venue for 2003. Atlanta served as host city from 2004 through 2010. In 2005, the contract with Atlanta was extended through 2007 with options for 2008 and 2009. In 2009, St. Louis was selected, from three finalists, to serve as host city for 2011 through 2013. In 2012, the tenure at St. Louis was extended until 2014. In 2013, the tenure in St. Louis was once again extended for three additional years through 2017.

The 2017 through 2019 championships consisted of two championship events, located in two different cities on back to back weekends. The 2017 championships was held in St. Louis, centered at the Edward Jones Dome, and in Houston, Texas, at the George R. Brown Convention Center, Toyota Center, and Minute Maid Park. 2017 marked St. Louis's final hosting of the event for the foreseeable future, ending its seven years hosting the event, as well as FIRST Championships's return to Houston, following the 2003 Championships at NRG Park. In 2018 and 2019, Houston continued to host a championship, with Detroit, Michigan taking St. Louis's place. The Detroit championships took place at Cobo Center and Ford Field.

FIRST Robotics Competition

The FIRST Robotics Competition Championship is the final and largest event of the season. The winners of each regional competition as well as the top teams from each district advance to the FIRST Championship. They are placed into one of the 8 divisions to compete. The winning alliance from each division (a set of 4 teams) moves on to compete on the Einstein Field. The winning alliance on the Einstein Field is declared the FIRST Champion.

The FIRST Robotics Competition Championship was initially divided into 4 divisions:
 Newton
 Galileo
 Archimedes
 Curie

In 2015, the 4 divisions were further divided into 8 divisions (not including the final Einstein Field) and expanding naming to share more breadth in hero innovators:
 Newton
 Galileo
 Archimedes
 Curie
 Tesla
 Hopper
 Carver
 Carson

In 2017, the first year of the split championship, 4 more divisions were added bringing the total to 12 divisions (not including the final Einstein Field in each city), with six divisions in each city. The six division winning alliances played a round-robin tournament to determine their location's champion, who then played the other city's champion in July at the FIRST Festival of Champions in New Hampshire. On February 6, 2018, FIRST announced that the Festival of Champions would not happen from the 2018 season onward. Due to this, the winners of both championships will now be considered world champions.
Houston:
 Carver
 Galileo
 Hopper
 Newton
 Roebling
 Turing

St. Louis/Detroit:
 Archimedes
 Carson
 Curie
 Daly
 Darwin
 Tesla

There are many awards that are presented to FRC teams at the Championship. These awards include the Engineering Inspiration Award, the Industrial Design Award, the Gracious Professionalism Award, the Entrepreneurship Award, the Industrial Safety Award, the Rookie All-Star Award, the Rookie Inspiration Award, the Woodie Flowers Award,  and the Dean's List Award. The most prestigious award is the Chairman's Award, which recognizes the team that best represents a model for other teams to emulate both on and off the field.

Recent winners
{| class="wikitable"  style="width:90%; text-align:center;"
!2022 / Rapid React
!Award name
!Team name
!Team number
!City, State/Country
|-
|2022 / Rapid React
|Championship Winner #1
|Up-A-Creek Robotics
|1619
|Longmont, CO, USA
|-
|2022 / Rapid React
|Championship Winner #2
|The Cheesy Poofs
|254
|San Jose, CA, USA
|-
|2022 / Rapid React
|Championship Winner #3
|Knight Vision
|3175 
|Grosse Pointe Woods, Michigan, USA
|-
|2022 / Rapid React
|Championship Winner #4
|Fusion Corps
|6672
|Irving, Texas, USA
|-
|2022 / Rapid React
|Chairman's Award
|Garrett Coalition
|1629
|Accident, Maryland, USA
|-
! 2019 / Destination Deep Space
! Award name
! Team name
! Team number
! City, State/Country
|-
|2019 / Destination: Deep Space
|Detroit / Detroit FIRST Championship Winner #1
|Brighton TechnoDogs
|3707
|Brighton, Michigan, USA
|-
|2019 / Destination: Deep Space
|Detroit / Detroit FIRST Championship Winner #2
|ThunderChickens
|217
|Sterling Heights, Michigan, USA
|-
|2019 / Destination: Deep Space
|Detroit / Detroit FIRST Championship Winner #3
|Team Rembrandts
|4481
|Eindhoven, North Brabant, Netherlands
|-
|2019 / Destination: Deep Space
|Detroit / Detroit FIRST Championship Winner #4
|SCH Vulcan Robotics
|1218
|Philadelphia, Pennsylvania, USA
|-
|2019 / Destination: Deep Space
|Detroit Chairman's
|The Green Machine
|1816
|Edina, Minnesota, USA
|-
|2019 / Destination: Deep Space
|Houston / Houston FIRST Championship Winner #1
|Greybots
|973
|Atascadero, CA, U.S.
|-
|2019 / Destination: Deep Space
|Houston / Houston FIRST Championship Winner #2
|MadTown Robotics
|1323
|Madera, CA, U.S.
|-
|2019 / Destination: Deep Space
|Houston / Houston FIRST Championship Winner #3
|Iron Panthers
|5026
|Burlingame, CA, U.S.
|-
|2019 / Destination: Deep Space
|Houston / Houston FIRST Championship Winner #4
|The Vitruvian Bots
|4201
|El Segundo, CA, U.S.
|-
|2019 / Destination: Deep Space
|Houston Chairman's
|Exploding Bacon
|1902
|Orlando, FL, U.S.
|-
!
!
!
!
!
|-
!2018 / FIRST Power Up
!Award name
!Team name
!Team number
!City, State/Country
|-
|2018 / FIRST Power Up
|Detroit / Detroit FIRST Championship Winner #1
|Stryke Force
|2767
|Kalamazoo, MI, U.S.
|-
|2018 / FIRST Power Up
|Detroit / Detroit FIRST Championship Winner #2
|Team RUSH
|27
|Clarkston, MI, U.S.
|-
|2018 / FIRST Power Up
|Detroit / Detroit FIRST Championship Winner #3
|Lake Effect Robotics
|2708
|Kingston, ON, Canada
|-
|2018 / FIRST Power Up
|Detroit / Detroit FIRST Championship Winner #4
|Centre County 4-H Robotics
|4027
|State College, PA, U.S.
|-
|2018 / FIRST Power Up
|Detroit Chairman's
|Bionic Black Hawks
|2834
|Bloomfield Hills, MI, U.S.
|-
|2018 / FIRST Power Up 
|Houston / Houston FIRST Championship Winner #1
|The Cheesy Poofs
|254
|San Jose, CA, U.S. 
|-
|2018 / FIRST Power Up 
|Houston / Houston FIRST Championship Winner #2
|The Robowranglers
|148
|Greenville, TX, U.S.
|-
|2018 / FIRST Power Up 
|Houston / Houston FIRST Championship Winner #3
|Spartabots
|2976
|Sammamish, WA, U.S.
|-
|2018 / FIRST Power Up 
|Houston / Houston FIRST Championship Winner #4
|Ha-Dream Team 
|3075
|Hod-Ha'Sharon, HaMerkaz, Israel
|-
|2018 / FIRST Power Up
|Houston Chairman's
|Kell Robotics
|1311
|Kennesaw, GA, U.S.
|-
!
!
!
!
!
|-
!2017 / FIRST Steamworks
!Award name
!Team name
!Team number
!City, State/Country
|-
|2017 / FIRST Steamworks
|St Louis / Festival of Champions Winner #1
|Stryke Force
|2767
|Kalamazoo, MI, U.S.
|-
|2017 / FIRST Steamworks
|St Louis / Festival of Champions Winner #2
|The Cheesy Poofs
|254
|San Jose, CA, U.S.
|-
|2017 / FIRST Steamworks
|St Louis / Festival of Champions Winner #3
|Lightning Robotics
|862
|Canton, MI, U.S.
|-
|2017 / FIRST Steamworks
|St Louis / Festival of Champions Winner #4
|The Pascack PI-oneers
|1676
|Montvale, NJ, U.S.
|-
|2017 / FIRST Steamworks
|St Louis Chairman's
|Mountaineer Area RoboticS (MARS)
|2614
|Morgantown, WV, U.S.
|-
|2017 / FIRST Steamworks
|Houston Festival of Champions Representative
|Columbus Space Program
|4188
|Columbus, GA, U.S.
|-
|2017 / FIRST Steamworks
|Houston Winner #1
|Greybots
|973
|Atascadero, CA, U.S.
|-
|2017 / FIRST Steamworks
|Houston Winner #2
|CRUSH
|1011
|Tucson, AZ, U.S.
|-
|2017 / FIRST Steamworks
|Houston Winner #3
|Viking Robotics
|2928
|Seattle/Ballard, WA, U.S.
|-
|2017 / FIRST Steamworks
|Houston Winner #4
|Bay Orangutans
|5499
|Berkeley, CA, U.S.
|-
|2017 / FIRST Steamworks
|Houston Chairman's
|Thunder Down Under
|3132
|Sydney, Australia
|-
!
!
!
!
!
|-
!2016 / FIRST Stronghold
!Award name
!Team name
!Team number
!City, State/Country
|-
| 2016 / FIRST Stronghold
| Championship Winner #1
| The Beach Bots
| 330
| Hermosa Beach, CA, U.S.
|-
| 2016 / FIRST Stronghold
| Championship Winner #2
| Roboteers
| 2481
| Tremont, IL, U.S.
|-
| 2016 / FIRST Stronghold
| Championship Winner #3
| Cleveland's Team
| 120
| Cleveland, OH, U.S.
|-
| 2016 / FIRST Stronghold
| Championship Winner #4
| Blue Cheese
| 1086
| Glen Allen, VA, U.S.
|-
| 2016 / FIRST Stronghold 
| Chairman's Award
| HIGHROLLERS
| 987
| Las Vegas, NV, U.S.
|-
!
!
!
!
!
|-
!2015 / Recycle Rush
!Award name
!Team name
!Team number
!City, State/Country
|- 
| 2015 / Recycle Rush
| Championship Winner #1
| Robonauts
| 118
| League City, TX, U.S.
|-
| 2015 / Recycle Rush 
| Championship Winner #2
| Citrus Circuits
| 1678
| Davis, CA, U.S.
|-
| 2015 / Recycle Rush 
| Championship Winner #3
| Buchanan Bird Brains
| 1671
| Clovis, CA, U.S.
|-
| 2015 / Recycle Rush 
| Championship Winner #4
| Gryffingear
| 5012
| Palmdale, CA, U.S.
|-
| 2015 / Recycle Rush 
| Chairman's Award
| Wolverines
| 597
| Los Angeles, U.S.
|-
!
!
!
!
!
|-
!2014 / Aerial Assist
!Award name
!Team name
!Team number
!City, State/Country
|-
| 2014 / Aerial Assist
| Championship Winner #1
| The Cheesy Poofs
| 254
| San Jose, CA, U.S.
|-
| 2014 / Aerial Assist
| Championship Winner #2
| Las Guerrillas
| 469
| Bloomfield Hills, MI, U.S.
|-
| 2014 / Aerial Assist
| Championship Winner #3
| The All Sparks
| 2848
| Dallas, TX, U.S.
|-
| 2014 / Aerial Assist
| Championship Winner #4
| Team C.H.A.O.S
| 74
| Holland, MI, U.S.
|-
| 2014 / Aerial Assist
| Chairman's Award
| Team RUSH
| 27
| Clarkston, MI, U.S.
|-
!
!
!
!
!
|-
!2013 / Ultimate Ascent
!Award name
!Team name
!Team number
!City, State/Country
|-
| 2013 / Ultimate Ascent
| Championship Winner #1
| Theory6
| 1241
| Mississauga, ON, Canada
|-
| 2013 / Ultimate Ascent
| Championship Winner #2
| Texas Torque
| 1477
| The Woodlands, TX, U.S.
|-
| 2013 / Ultimate Ascent
| Championship Winner #3
| The Coyotes
| 610
| Toronto, ON, Canada
|-
| 2013 / Ultimate Ascent
| Chairman's Award
| The Holy Cows
| 1538
| San Diego, CA, U.S.
|-
!
!
!
!
!
|-
!2012 / Rebound Rumble
!Award name
!Team name
!Team number
!City, State/Country
|-
| 2012 / Rebound Rumble
| Championship Winner #1
| S.P.A.M. (Martin County School District & Clark Advanced Learning Center)
| 180
| Stuart, FL, U.S.
|-
| 2012 / Rebound Rumble
| Championship Winner #2
| Raider Robotix (North Brunswick Township High School)
| 25
| North Brunswick, NJ, U.S.
|-
| 2012 / Rebound Rumble
| Championship Winner #3
| Bomb Squad (Mountain Home Public Schools)
| 16
| Mountain Home, AR, U.S.
|-
| 2012 / Rebound Rumble
| Chairman's Award
| Simbotics (Governor Simcoe Secondary School)
| 1114
| St. Catharines, ON, Canada
|-
!
!
!
!
!
|-
!2011 / Logomotion
!Award name
!Team name
!Team number
!City, State/Country
|-
| 2011 / Logomotion
| Championship Winner #1
| The Cheesy Poofs (Bellarmine College Preparatory)
| 254
| San Jose, CA, U.S.
|-
| 2011 / Logomotion
| Championship Winner #2
| WildStang (Rolling Meadows High School & Wheeling High School)
| 111
| Schaumburg, IL, U.S.
|-
| 2011 / Logomotion
| Championship Winner #3
| Greybots (Atascadero High School)
| 973
| Atascadero, CA, U.S.
|-
| 2011 / Logomotion
| Chairman's Award
| The Hawaiian Kids (Waialua High School)
| 359
| Waialua, HI, U.S.
|-
!
!
!
!
!
|-
!2010 / Breakaway
!Award name
!Team name
!Team number
!City, State/Country
|-
| 2010 / Breakaway
| Championship Winner #1
| Beach Cities Robotics (Mira Costa High School & Redondo Union High School)
| 294
| Redondo Beach, CA, U.S.
|-
| 2010 / Breakaway
| Championship Winner #2
| The HOT Team (Huron Valley Schools)
| 67
| Milford, MI, U.S.
|-
| 2010 / Breakaway
| Championship Winner #3
| Bobcat Robotics (South Windsor High School)
| 177
| South Windsor, CT, U.S.
|-
| 2010 / Breakaway
| Chairman's Award
| Miss Daisy (Wissahickon High School)
| 341
| Ambler, PA, U.S.
|-
!
!
!
!
!
|-
!2009 / Lunacy
!Award name
!Team name
!Team number
!City, State/Country
|-
| 2009 / Lunacy<ref name="pr09">20,000 Cheer FIRST Students at the Ultimate Celebration of Science and Technology, Reuters (from Business Wire), April 19, 2009 - accessed May 23, 2009</ref>
| Championship Winner #1
| WildStang (Rolling Meadows High School & Wheeling High School)
| 111
| Schaumburg, IL, U.S.
|-
| 2009 / Lunacy
| Championship Winner #2
| The HOT Team (Huron Valley Schools)
| 67
| Milford, MI, U.S.
|-
| 2009 / Lunacy
| Championship Winner #3
| Spartan Robotics (Mountain View High School)
| 971
| Mountain View, CA, U.S.
|-
| 2009 / Lunacy
| Chairman's Award
| Techno Ticks (Lyme-Old Lyme High School)
| 236 
| Old Lyme, CT, U.S.
|}

FTC World Championship

Before 2014, after all FTC teams have competed in state / regional championship tournaments, the winning teams move on to the FTC World Championship. The Inspire Award-winning teams and the captain teams of the Winning Alliance in the regional tournaments are automatically eligible for the world championship. If there are still spots available, additional teams may be picked by a lottery system.

From 2014 and on, teams compete in Qualifying Tournaments in order to qualify for their state/regional Championship. At that Championship, teams compete for a spot at one of 4 Super-Regionals. Depending on the presence/number of teams in each state, determines the number of teams that move on to a Super-Regional. Teams then advance from their Super-Regional to the World Championship. Starting in the 2018–2019 season, Super-Regionals will be abolished and FTC teams will advance to the World Championship directly from their state/regional Championship.

At each championship, awards are presented to recognize teams for their performance in the competition, their robot's design, and their efforts to spread the message of FIRST. These awards include World Championship Finalist and Winner, the Design Award, the Connect Award, the Innovate Award, the Motivate Award, the Think Award and the Judges' Award. The most notable awards are the World Championship Inspire Award and the award given to the winning alliance.

The FTC World Championship is currently held in Houston and Detroit, an arrangement that will continue until at least 2021.

FTC has four divisions that teams are randomly divided into. There are two divisions per Championship.

Houston:
 Franklin
 Jemison

Detroit:
 Edison
 Ochoa

Up until the end of the 2016 season, winning alliances from Franklin and Edison went on to compete in the finals on the DaVinci Field. In 2017, FTC teams joined FRC teams to play their finals matches on the Einstein Field.

Recent winners

FLL World Festival

The top competitions in FLL program are FLL Open Championships and FLL World Festival. The Open Championships are managed by FLL Partners with a goal to bring teams from different regions to complete and showcase their achievements. Currently, there are two Open Championships, FLL Open European Championship and FLL US Open Championship. FLL Open Asian Championship was held in 2008 in Tokyo, Japan. However, it did not return in 2009.

FLL World Festival is hosted and managed by FIRST. The teams are often the Champion's Award team at the state or national level with some other criteria including special nomination from FLL Operational Partners globally. In 2009, there were 84 teams from 27 countries that joined the festival with the theme Climate Connections''. The award categories include Innovative Design Award, Quality Design Award, Programming Award, Research Quality Award, Innovative Solution Award, Creative Presentation Award, Teamwork Award, Team Spirit Awards, Against All Odds Awards, Outstanding Volunteer Awards, Adult Coach/Mentor Awards, Young Adult Mentor Awards, and Judges' Awards. The most notable awards are Champion's Award and Robot Performance Award.

Recent winners

References

Bibliography

External links

For Inspiration and Recognition of Science and Technology
Lego
Recurring events established in 1992
Student robotics competitions